Jenny Thompson (born 1973) is an American swimmer.

Jenny Thompson may also refer to:

Jean Thompson (athlete) (1910–1976), Canadian runner known as Jenny

See also
Jennifer Thompson (disambiguation)